This is a list of the Los Premios MTV Latinoamérica winners and nominees for Artist of the Year.

Latin American music awards
Latin American music
Latin music musicians
MTV Video Music Awards